Craigville is an unincorporated community in Lancaster Township, Wells County, in the U.S. state of Indiana.

History
Craigville was named after William J. Craig, a county clerk. The Craigville post office has been in operation since 1879.

Geography

References

Unincorporated communities in Wells County, Indiana
Unincorporated communities in Indiana
Fort Wayne, IN Metropolitan Statistical Area